This Stupid World is the 17th studio album by American indie rock band Yo La Tengo, released on February 10, 2023 by Matador Records. It was recorded and produced by the band in their studio space intermittently between 2020 and 2022 around the COVID-19 pandemic. This Stupid World has received highly positive reviews from critics for the lyrics and musicianship, and the album has been promoted with single releases and a concert tour.

Recording

This Stupid World grew out of jams that the band wrote and recorded in their Hoboken, New Jersey studio space as part of their regular process of playing together, without the expectation of recording an album; these sessions began immediately before the COVID-19 pandemic, which caused the trio to pause recording for several months. Live performance commitments for the band were also canceled as they made these recordings, leading them to record This Stupid World until mid-March 2020, when they went to following COVID-19 restrictions. After performing a few live shows and their annual Hannukah series of performances, they returned to recording for this album in the last few days of 2021. The spontaneity of those holiday performances reinvigorated Yo La Tengo to return to experimenting in the studio and unlike 2020's We Have Amnesia Sometimes, the band recorded these sessions knowing they would be put to record, with multi-track recording and overdubs. The band initially wanted to release the album as soon as possible digitally via their long-time label Matador Records, but ended up missing a July 2022 deadline for autumn release and tinkered with the recordings and pushed back release to early 2023.

The songs were written and recorded as instrumentals, with lyrics added in last and while the band has typically collaborated and used outside producers, they decided that their competence in the studio and experience as musicians did not require an external record producer or mixing engineer. Bassist James McNew handled much of the recording and mixing duties, relying largely on live in-studio performance with minimal loops or overdubbing. He also reached out to fellow musician and former collaborator Jad Fair for advice on recording techniques. Prior to giving the recordings to mastering engineer Greg Calbi, the only other person involved in the recordings was horn player C. J. Camerieri, who provides French horn on two tracks. Themes and moods on the recordings came up naturally, without any particular plan for a cohesive angle or intent. The album title is similarly up for interpretation and has no single meaning.

Release and promotion

Yo La Tengo announced the release in November 2022, previewing the track "Fallout". “Aselestine” (January) and “Sinatra Drive Breakdown” (February) were also shared before the album release. The band also announced a tour of the United States and Europe across February to May 2023 to promote the album. Setlists from this tour emphasize songs off of this album, but also include older Yo La Tengo songs, as well as the band's signature mix of cover versions. The tour did not feature opening acts, but the final Los Angeles date included a surprise appearance by Mike Belitsky and Travis Good of The Sadies. At the March 13 show, the band cross-dressed to protest Tennessee Senate Bill 3.

Reception

This Stupid World received universal acclaim from critics noted at review aggregator Metacritic. It has a weighted average score of 85 out of 100, based on 22 reviews. The editors of AnyDecentMusic? average up 21 reviews as a 7.9 out of 10.

Pitchfork named this release the Best New Music and reviewer Grayson Haver Currin scored it an 8.5 out of 10, calling it the band's "liveliest album in at least a decade", writing that it "feels focused and lean"; it was one of 10 albums of the week recommended by the publication. The editors of Rolling Stone highlighted this album for its readers to listen to and critic Jon Dolan emphasized the ability of the band's lyrics and musicianship to explore dark and depressive moods. Writing for Exclaim!, Nicholas Sokic rated this album an eight out of 10, also pointing out the longevity of the band and opining that this "is a far livelier and live-sounding album than one would expect from a group this deep into their career". For Paste, Zach Schonfeld gave This Stupid World an eight out of 10, praising the "hermetic bubble" that the band used when recording the music and noting that they lyrics explore "perseverance in a stupid world is its own kind of hope"; the magazine listed it as one of the top 10 albums of the month. In a review that scores this album four out of five, Sunnyvale of Sputnik Music calling this "an absolute shot in the arm" that is "an immensely satisfying listen". Writing for Glide Magazine, Mac Lockett calls this album a return to form, connecting this sound to the band's work prior to 2006, with moods of "beguiling sadness to the resultant beauty of dismissing its own urgency" and "innate energy and some of the group’s strongest songwriting in years". Michael Elliott of No Depression also points out "drones of noise [that] rumble" in some tracks, as well as the "haunting vocal contributions" by Georgia Hubley.

The editors of AllMusic Guide scored this album four out of five stars, with reviewer Mark Deming opining that the musicians are "still finding new ways of doing things" with "music [that] feels warmer and more emotionally satisfying" than anything they have released in over a decade. Jem Aswad of Variety calls this "their loudest and liveliest outing in years", while staying within their signature indie rock sound. Lee Zimmerman of American Songwriter gave this album 3.5 out of five stars for having "odd and unexpected" tracks that have "resolve and resilience" in the lyrics. For NPR's All Songs Considered, host Bob Boilen highlighted "Fallout" as a preview for the album and "Tonight's Episode" upon release; the publisher named this one of the top five albums of the week. Fader and JamBase also listed This Stupid World among the albums of the week. In Under the Radar, Michael James Hall rated the album 8.5 out of 10 stars, calling it a "triumphant stylistic return to peak form" with "a tender, tenebrous beauty". In The Jersey Journal, Jim Testa speculated that this could be the best rock album of the 2020s and that the band defines "the Hoboken sound". In The Philadelphia Inquirer, This Stupid World was the number four album of the week. Jon M. Gilbertson of The Shepherd Express characterizes this release "an intimate head trip" with songs that are "loose-limbed, if stylistically varied". In Tablet, David Meir Grossman compares this release to others across the band's career, noting how the musical sound continues a tradition of loud-and-quiet dynamics and blending the familiar with the chaotic, calling This Stupid World :one of their best albums in decades". In the Burlington County Times, Marc Masters highlights the theme of the passage of time and calls this "the most live-sounding Yo La Tengo album in a while".

Steven Johnson of musicOMH scored this album 4.5 out of five stars, writing that they are "reverting to their signature sound, consolidating their position as alternative treasures". In The Skinny, Tony Inglis gave This Stupid World four out of five stars, calling the music "reflective and funny" and noting that the band "continue[s] to defy" forty years into their career. Alternately, Zara Hedderman of The Quietus points out the band's playfulness and sense of humor, writing that this album "sounds like a body of recordings made by the band over a fruitful and fun weekend two decades ago. You could say it’s the sonic equivalent of finding a beloved jumper you’d forgotten about or assumed missing that miraculously re-appears at the back of a dusty drawer. As soon as you step into the world created by the trio, there’s an immediate warmth and familiarity to the compositions." Mojos Stevie Chick rated this album four out of five stars, noting that this album "marks a gear change from Yo La Tengo’s recent records", by exploring emotionally heavy themes and noting the musicians high level of craft. In Uncut, Sam Richards also gave an eight out of 10, emphasizing the "childlike quality" of the band members' musical experimentation deep into their careers. Theo Gorst of Loud and Quiet gave the same score as Uncut and noting that this album eschews the restraint of the band's recent albums, with "resolution... wrought from noise".

For Gigwise, Charlotte Grimwade gave This Stupid World eight out of 10 stars for an album that "allow[s] anxiety, acceptance and existentialism to battle it out" that has an "unsettling sense of impending doom" paired with "reassuring vocals and... lighter tracks... that captures abrasive uncertainty and soothing acceptance perfectly". For The Arts Desk, Guy Oddy gave This Stupid World three out of five stars for including "mellow and woozy shades" alongside "psychedelic vibes". Calling this album "gorgeously untethered", Ed Power of The Irish Examiner rated This Stupid World four out of five stars. Another eight out of 10 came from Benjamin Graye of Clash, writing that this release is "very much in the mould of a classic Yo La Tengo album", but they "bring more than enough energy, variety and tallent to create wonderful new songs that all sit comfortably inside this little world whilst still sounding as vibrant and into it as they did 30 years ago". Michael Hahn of The Guardian rated this four out of five stars, naming it "a quintessential YLT album", emphasizing the subtle interplay between sounds and moods that is created between Hubley and Ira Kaplan. Sister publication The Observer gave the same score, with critic Phil Mongredien praising the mix of playful, absurdist lyrics alongside serious and introspective ones. Writing for The Daily Telegraph, Cat Woods gives another four out of five stars, assessing that the band "sound as fresh and relevant now as they ever have". The Evening Standards David Smyth rated this album three out of five stars, cautioning new listeners "if you’re not already invested in the band this could all come across as a shade intimidating, if it wasn’t for a couple of truly beautiful compositions" and concluding that "marvellous things can still happen" with this seasoned musical group. The British Ticketmaster named this the album of the week, with critic Mark Grassick characterizing this release as "capturing the magic of three kindred spirits playing in the moment", noting that the music never gets boring as "Yo La Tengo’s technique has captured so many spontaneous rehearsal room moments that usually vanish into the ether". In The Scotsman, Fiona Shepherd gave this album three out of five stars, calling the music "psychedelic garage rock territory, carving meditative, timeless reflections from sprawling live jams".

Mints Sanjoy Narayan proposed that Yo La Tengo may be "the greatest band you never heard of" and noting that this album brings to mind the band's best releases for "veering from a soft and quiet understated sound to loud, raw and noisy". Writing for The New Zealand Herald, Peter Baker calls This Stupid World "Yo La Tengo's most compelling and concise album in ages".

Track listing

All lyrics written by Ira Kaplan and all music written by Georgia Hubley, Ira Kaplan, and James McNew
"Sinatra Drive Breakdown" – 7:25
"Fallout" – 4:36
"Tonight's Episode" – 4:50
"Aselestine" – 3:50
"Until It Happens" – 3:15
"Apology Letter" – 4:17
"Brain Capers" – 5:35
"This Stupid World" – 7:28
"Miles Away" – 7:30
Vinyl edition bonus track
untitled, unlisted instrumental – 7:02
On the vinyl edition of the album, "Brain Capers" extends into the locked groove. The track length listed on the record itself is marked as ∞.

Personnel

Yo La Tengo
Georgia Hubley – drums, vocals, production
Ira Kaplan – guitar, vocals, production
James McNew – bass guitar, vocals, engineering, mixing, production
Additional personnel
Greg Calbi – mastering at Sterling Sound, Edgewater, New Jersey, United States
C. J. Camerieri – French horn on "Aselestine" and "Apology Letter"
David Godlis – photography
Mark Ohe – design

Charts
This Stupid World was the highest-charting album from Yo La Tengo in the United States, debuting at eighth place on the Billboard Top Album Sales chart, selling 6,000 units in its first week.

Release history

See also

List of 2023 albums

References

External links

Aggregate reviews from Album of the Year
James McNew Reddit AMA to promote the album
Track By Track: Yo La Tengo – This Stupid World

2023 albums
Matador Records albums
Yo La Tengo albums